Tree Island is a small island in the Fraser River in Coquitlam, British Columbia. It's located near the mouth of the Coquitlam River, just east of the Port Mann Bridge.

References

Landforms of Coquitlam
Islands of British Columbia